is a passenger railway station located in  Minami-ku, Yokohama, Kanagawa Prefecture, Japan, operated by the private railway company Keikyū.

Lines
Idogaya Station is served by the Keikyū Main Line and is located 27.7 kilometers from the terminus of the line at Shinagawa  Station in Tokyo.

Station layout
The station consists of two elevated opposed side platforms with the station building underneath.

Platforms

History
Idogaya Station was opened on April 1, 1930. The platform for north-bound trains was lengthened to accommodate 8-car long trains in 1978, and the south-bound platform was similarly lengthened in 1987.

Keikyū introduced station numbering to its stations on 21 October 2010; Idogaya Station was assigned station number KK41.

Passenger statistics
In fiscal 2019, the station was used by an average of 29,035 passengers daily. 

The passenger figures for previous years are as shown below.

Surrounding area
 Yokohama City Idogaya Elementary School
 Yokohama Minami Post Office

See also
 List of railway stations in Japan

References

External links

 

Railway stations in Kanagawa Prefecture
Railway stations in Japan opened in 1930
Keikyū Main Line
Railway stations in Yokohama